Anderson Luis Domingos or simply  Anderson (born September 15, 1988) is a Brazilian football left back. He currently plays for Club Sportivo Sergipe.

Made professional debut for Cruzeiro in 0–3 home defeat to Corinthians in the Campeonato Brasileiro, on May 20, 2007, coming on as a half-time substitute for Léo Fortunato.

Contract
1 August 2006 to 30 July 2009

References

External links
 CBF
 zerozero.pt
 Guardian Stats Centre

1988 births
Living people
Brazilian footballers
Cruzeiro Esporte Clube players
Ipatinga Futebol Clube players
Clube Atlético Bragantino players
Associação Atlética Ponte Preta players
Guaratinguetá Futebol players
Association football defenders
Footballers from São Paulo